James Joseph (11 May 1957) is a Guyanese cyclist, specializing in track cycling match sprinting. 9th overall in match sprints in the 1980 Summer Olympics and competed in match sprints in the 1984 Summer Olympics In October 2017, Joseph set the 200m Flying Start world record of 11.42 seconds at the International Cycling Union (UCI) World Masters Championship in California, USA.

References

External links
 

1957 births
Living people
Guyanese male cyclists
Commonwealth Games competitors for Guyana
Cyclists at the 1978 Commonwealth Games
Olympic cyclists of Guyana
Cyclists at the 1980 Summer Olympics
Cyclists at the 1984 Summer Olympics
Place of birth missing (living people)